Buttercrambe with Bossall is a civil parish in the Ryedale district of North Yorkshire, England. The parish had  a population of 100 according to the 2001 census, increasing to 105 at the 2011 census.  The parish is near Stamford Bridge, and contains  Buttercrambe and Bossall.

References

Civil parishes in North Yorkshire